Achalinus werneri, also known commonly as the Amami odd-scaled snake and the Amami Takachiho snake, is a species of snake in the family Xenodermatidae. The species is endemic to the Ryukyu Islands, Japan. There are no subspecies that are currently recognized.

Etymology
The specific name, werneri, is in honor of Austrian herpetologist Franz Werner.

Habitat
The preferred natural habitats of A werneri are forest, grassland, and freshwater wetlands.

Reproduction
A. werneri is oviparous.

Conservation status
In 1996 the species Achalinus werneri was classified as Near Threatened by the IUCN. This is because its range is estimated to be less than 20,000 km2 (7,722 sq mi), or its area of occupancy is estimated to be less than 2,000 km2 (772 sq mi), and estimates indicate its range is severely fragmented, or known to exist at no more than ten locations, and that a continuing decline has been inferred, observed or projected in the area, extent and/or quality of its habitat.

References

Further reading
Goris RC, Maeda N (2004). Guide to the Amphibians and Reptiles of Japan. Malabar, Florida: Krieger Publishing Company. 285 pp. .
Ota H (2000). "Current status of the threatened amphibians and reptiles of Japan". Population Ecology 42: 5–9.
Van Denburgh J (1912). "Concerning Certain Species of Reptiles and Amphibians from China, Japan, the Loo Choo Islands, and Formosa". Proceedings of the California Academy of Sciences, Fourth Series 3: 187–258. (Achalinus werneri, new species, pp. 254–255).

Xenodermidae
Endemic reptiles of Japan
Endemic fauna of the Ryukyu Islands
Reptiles described in 1912
Taxonomy articles created by Polbot